The Men Around Lucy (German:Die Männer um Lucie) is a 1931 American drama film directed and produced by Alexander Korda and starring Liane Haid, Walter Rilla and Oskar Karlweis. Made at the Joinville Studios in Paris, it is one of several multi-language versions of the 1930 film Laughter, with distribution in Germany by UFA as part of the Parufamet agreement. The movie is considered lost.

Cast
 Liane Haid as Lucie  
 Walter Rilla as Robert  
 Oskar Karlweis as Karl  
 Trude Hesterberg as Lola  
 Lien Deyers as Daisy  
 Ernst Stahl-Nachbaur as Prunier 
 Charles Puffy as Wirt  
 Jaro Fürth as Bettler  
 Eugen Jensen as Oberkellner

References

Bibliography
 Cheryl Krasnick Warsh & Dan Malleck. Consuming Modernity: Gendered Behaviour and Consumerism before the Baby Boom. UBC Press, 2013.

External links
 

1931 films
1931 drama films
1930s German-language films
American drama films
Paramount Pictures films
Films directed by Alexander Korda
American multilingual films
Films shot at Joinville Studios
American black-and-white films
UFA GmbH films
Lost American films
1931 multilingual films
Lost drama films
1931 lost films
1930s American films